The discography of American rapper Juelz Santana consists of two studio albums, one compilation album, seven mixtapes, and 22 singles.

Albums

Studio albums

Compilation albums

Mixtapes

Singles

As lead artist

As a featured artist

Promotional singles

Guest appearances

Music videos

See also 
 The Diplomats discography
 Skull Gang discography

References 

Hip hop discographies
Discographies of American artists